Nong Wua So is a district (amphoe) in the western part of Udon Thani province, northeastern Thailand.

Geography
Neighboring districts are (from the north clockwise) Kut Chap, Mueang Udon Thani, and Nong Saeng of Udon Thani Province, Khao Suan Kwang of Khon Kaen province and Non Sang and Mueang Nongbua Lamphu of Nong Bua Lamphu province.

History
The district was established as a minor district (king amphoe) on 16 April 1971, when it was split off from Mueang Udon Thani district. It was upgraded to a full district on 1 April 1974.

Administration
The district is divided into eight sub-districts (tambons), which are further subdivided into 78 villages (mubans). There are two townships (thesaban tambon). Nong Wua So covers parts of tambons Nong Wua So and Mak Ya; and Nong O Non Wai covers parts of tambons Nong O and Non Wai. There are a further seven tambon administrative organizations (TAO).

References

External links
amphoe.com

Nong Wua So